Illinois is the second studio album by American country music artist Brett Eldredge.  It was released on September 11, 2015 via Atlantic Records Nashville. Its lead single, "Lose My Mind", was released to country radio on May 4, 2015. The album's second single, "Drunk on Your Love" was released to country radio on November 9, 2015. The album's third single, "Wanna Be That Song" released to country radio on May 23, 2016. Eldredge co-wrote every song, and produced the album with Ross Copperman and Brad Crisler.

Critical reception
Giving it 4 out of 5 stars, Stephen Thomas Erlewine praised the album's R&B influences, saying that "Such soulfulness and sly stylistic diversity were largely absent on Bring You Back, a quite pleasing set of by-the-books radio country, and it certainly enlivens Illinois, but not at the expense of strong songs."

Commercial performance
Illinois entered the US Billboard 200 chart at number 3, selling 51,000 equivalent units in the week ending September 17 (including 44,000 traditional album sales). This marks the largest-selling week for an album in Eldredge's career, passing Bring You Back (2013), which sold 21,000 units in the first week on chart.  In the second week it sold an additional 9,500 copies. As of January 2017, the album has sold 175,800 copies domestically.

Track listing

Personnel
Stephanie Chapman - background vocals (track 4)
Ross Copperman - acoustic guitar, electric guitar, keyboards (track 9), programming, background vocals
Brad Crisler - bass guitar (track 10), acoustic guitar (track 10), electric guitar (track 10), keyboards (track 10), percussion (track 10), piano (tracks 7, 10), programming (tracks 7, 10), background vocals (tracks 7, 10)
Dan Dugmore - pedal steel guitar
Brett Eldredge - lead vocals, background vocals, mouth percussion (track 11)
Fred Eltringham - drums, percussion
Josh Haselton - drums (track 10)
Mike Johnson - pedal steel guitar (track 7)
Troy Lancaster - electric guitar (track 7)
James LeBlanc - electric guitar (track 10)
Jason Lehning - keyboards
Tony Lucido - bass guitar
Heather Morgan - background vocals (track 8)
Jon Nite - background vocals (track 6)
Danny Rader - acoustic guitar (track 7)
Seth Rausch - drums (track 7)
Thomas Rhett - duet vocals (track 2)
Jimmie Lee Sloas - bass guitar (track 7)
Aaron Sterling - drums (track 9), percussion (track 9) 
Jason Webb - synthesizer (track 7)
Derek Wells - acoustic guitar, electric guitar, mandolin (tracks 3, 6)
Micah Willshire - background vocals (tracks 2, 9)

Charts

Weekly charts

Year-end charts

Singles

References 

2015 albums
Atlantic Records albums
Brett Eldredge albums
Albums produced by Ross Copperman